Zac Selmon (born November 23, 1984) is the current athletic director for the Mississippi State University Bulldogs.

Playing career
Selmon was a tight end for the Wake Forest Demon Deacons football team from 2003 to 2007, starting four years after redshirting in 2003. Wake Forest won their second ACC championship in school history in 2006.

Administrative career
Selmon filled various assistant athletic positions at Oklahoma, and a brief stint at North Carolina before returning to Oklahoma, prior to his appointment as athletic director at Mississippi State.

Personal life
A native of Norman, Oklahoma, Selmon attended Norman High School. He is the son of Dewey Selmon and the nephew of first overall NFL Draft pick Lee Roy Selmon and Lucious Selmon, who combined to form the defensive line at Oklahoma during their college years.

References

1985 births
Living people
Mississippi State Bulldogs athletic directors
Sportspeople from Norman, Oklahoma
Wake Forest Demon Deacons football players